FREE NOW is a mobility service provider headquartered in Hamburg, Germany. FREE NOW was formed in February 2019 from a joint venture between BMW and Daimler Mobility. Thomas Zimmermann is CEO of the FREE NOW Group.

The FREE NOW Group is the vehicle for hire vertical of this joint venture; other services within the vertical include Beat and formerly Clever, Hive and Kapten, which rebranded to FREE NOW. FREE NOW is one of the largest vehicle for hire companies in Europe. As Mobility-as-a-Service platform FREE NOW aggregates numerous mobility brands and vehicle options to make them bookable within one app. Next to taxi and PHV, FREE NOW offer car sharing and further micro-mobility options such as e-scooters, e-mopeds, and e-bikes with its partners TIER, VOI, EMMY, Cooltra, Miles, SHARE NOW, DOTT, felyx and SIXT. 

FREE NOW is serving over 150 European cities including Barcelona, Berlin, Dublin, Paris, Milan, Rome and London. FREE NOW customer care and support teams operate from Dublin, Hamburg, Madrid, and Warsaw among other European cities. 

The UK General Manager is Mariusz Zabrocki, and the Country Manager in Ireland is Niall Carson.

History

mytaxi was founded in 2009 by German entrepreneurs Niclaus Mewes and Sven Külper. Later that year, the pair founded the legal entity behind mytaxi, Intelligent Apps. In September 2014, Daimler acquired mytaxi's parent company, Intelligent Apps, entering the vehicle for hire market.

In 2016, the German e-hailing app mytaxi merged with Hailo. Founded in London in 2011, Hailo was a British technology platform that matched taxi drivers and passengers through its mobile phone application. The merger between mytaxi and Hailo made mytaxi the largest licensed taxi e-hailing operator.

Following regulatory approval in February 2019, Daimler and BMW announced the €1bn mobility joint-venture; the parent company is known as Your Now which also operates Share Now, ReachNow, Park Now and Charge Now. On 1 July 2019, myTaxi was rebranded to FREE NOW and has transformed from a taxi app into a fully integrated multi-mobility platform. 

In January 2021, FREE NOW announced a €6 million investment to fund its 14,000 drivers in Ireland with home charging kits to encourage them to switch to electric vehicles. Overall, FREE NOW wants to allocate more than EUR 100 million of resources in the coming five years to push the electrification of its rides across Europe.

References

External links
 

German companies established in 2016
Taxis
Ridesharing companies of Germany
Transport companies established in 2016